Naruna is an unincorporated community in Campbell County, Virginia, United States. Naruna has a post office with ZIP code 24576, which opened on August 24, 1883.

References

Unincorporated communities in Campbell County, Virginia
Unincorporated communities in Virginia